is a Japanese manga series by Mayu Shinjo. It was adapted into a live action film in 2012.

Plot

Ai o Utau Yori Ore Ni Oborero!

Akira Shiraishi, a young high school boy with feminine features, joins Blaue Rosen, the all-female band for which Mizuki Sakurazaka, an androgynous girl of the same age, performs lead electric guitar.

Their high school life is anything but typical: Mizuki is the "prince" of her all-girl school while Akira is the "princess" of the neighboring all-boy school. A series of comical events brings them closer together, even as the prejudice of the people around them tries to pull them apart.

Ai-Ore! Danshikō no Hime to Joshikō no Ōji

After announcing that he is a boy during a concert for Blaue Rosen in the first book, Akira and Mizuki begin to date. But as their relationship heats up, so does the feud between the two's schools.

Publication
Written and illustrated by Mayu Shinjo, Ai o Utau Yori Ore ni Oborero! was serialized in Shogakukan's Shōjo Comic magazine. Its chapters were compiled into five tankōbon volumes published from June 26, 2006 to July 26, 2007. A second series titled  was serialized in Monthly Asuka by Kadokawa Shoten and was published into tankobon format between May 22, 2008 to February 22, 2011. As it published Ai Ore!, Kadokawa Shoten also republished the first series into three volumes from February 23 to April 22, 2010.

When translating into English Viz Media combined the two series, with the first series collected into the three first volumes and the second series compiled in the remaining five books. Its first volume was published on May 3, 2011 while the last one was released on February 5, 2013. Viz also published a digital edition from June 17, 2011 to March 8, 2013. The two series were also published in Australia by Madman Entertainment, France by Pika Édition and in Germany by Egmont Manga & Anime.

Ai Ore!

Shogakukan version

Kadokawa Shoten and Viz Media version

Ai Ore! – Love Me

Anime
Along with the official announcement for the live-action film, Shinjo Mayu revealed that the manga was supposed to have an anime adaptation but was canceled due to unfortunate events.

Live-action

A live-action film adaptation, that would premier in the end of 2011, was first announced by Mayu Shinjo through her blog in July 2011. In January 2012, it was revealed that idol Karam from the K-pop band DGNA and actress Ito Ōno would star it. The film opened on August 25, 2012 and 2,000 copies of a "special mini-comic" by Shinjo herself were distributed. The film is directed by Sakurako Fukuyama and its main theme is "Ikenai 1-2-3" by DGNA.

Cast

 Karam as Akira Shiraishi
 Ito Ōno as Mizuki Sakurazaka
 Furukawa Yuta as Nikaidou Ran
 Terada Takuya as Kiryuuin Rui
 Akira as Naruse Kaoru
 Yoshiwara Shuto as Okita Ai
 Kawamura Haruka as Kidera Momoko
 Shishido Kavka as Yusa Megumi

Reception
The volumes 1, 2, 4 and 5 from the English publication of the series have been featuring in lists of 10 best-selling manga rankings such as The New York Times.

References

External links
 official homepage
 

2006 manga
Kadokawa Shoten manga
Live-action films based on manga
Madman Entertainment manga
Manga adapted into films
Mayu Shinjo
Romantic comedy anime and manga
Shogakukan franchises
Shogakukan manga
Shōjo manga
Viz Media manga
Japanese romantic comedy films